Alexander Lamb Cullen,   (30 April 1920 – 27 December 2013) was a British electrical engineer.

Career and research
Cullen served as the Head of Department of Electronic and Electrical Engineering at University College London where he held the Pender Chair, from 1967 to 1980. In 1988 he published his book Modern Radio Science and a biography of Harold Barlow.

Awards and honours
He was elected a Fellow of the Royal Society (FRS) in 1977 and awarded their Royal Medal in 1984 in recognition of his many distinguished contributions to microwave engineering, both theoretical and experimental, and in particular for research on microwave antennae. The same year he was awarded the Faraday Medal of the Institute of Electrical Engineers. He also the same year delivered the Clifford Paterson Lecture to the Royal Society on "Microwaves: the art and the science". He was appointed Order of the British Empire (OBE) in 1960.

References

Royal Medal winners
English electrical engineers
Academics of University College London
Fellows of the Royal Academy of Engineering
Fellows of the Royal Society
Officers of the Order of the British Empire
2013 deaths
1920 births